Calamansi (Citrus × microcarpa), also known as calamondin, Philippine lime, or Philippine lemon, is an economically important citrus hybrid predominantly cultivated in the Philippines. It is native to the Philippines, Borneo, Sumatra, and Sulawesi (Indonesia, Malaysia, and Brunei) in Southeast Asia; as well as southern China and Taiwan in East Asia. Calamansi is ubiquitous in traditional Filipino cuisine.  It is naturally very sour, and is used in various condiments, beverages, dishes, marinades, and preserves. Calamansi is also used as an ingredient in Malaysian and Indonesian cuisines.

Calamansi is a hybrid between kumquat (formerly considered as belonging to a separate genus Fortunella) and another species of Citrus (in this case probably the mandarin orange).

Names  

Calamansi is the Philippine English spelling of Tagalog kalamansi, and is the name by which it is most widely known in the Philippines. In parts of the United States (notably Florida), calamansi is also known as "calamondin", an old name from the American period of the Philippines. It is an anglicized form of the alternate Tagalog name kalamunding. Other English common names of calamansi include: lemonsito (or limoncito), philippine lime, calamonding, calamondin orange, calamandarin, golden lime, Philippine lemon, Panama orange (also used for kumquats), musk orange, bitter-sweets and acid orange.

Calamansi was formerly identified as Citrus mitis Blanco, C. microcarpa Bunge or C. madurensis Lour., all those referred to it as a citrus. Swingle's system of citrus classification would put kumquats into a separate genus, Fortunella, making the calamansi an intergeneric hybrid, and in 1975 it was given the hybrid name × Citrofortunella mitis by John Ingram and Harold E. Moore based on Blanco's species name, but in 1984, D. Onno Wijnands pointed out that Bunge's species name, C. microcarpa (1832), predated Blanco's Citrus mitis (1837), making × Citrofortunella microcarpa the proper name. Phylogenetic analysis now places the kumquat within the same genus as other citrus, meaning that its hybrids, including those formerly named as × Citrofortunella, likewise belong in Citrus.

Description 
The plant is characterized by wing-like appendages on the leaf petioles and white or purplish flowers. The center pulp and juice is the orange color of a tangerine with a very thin orange peel when ripe. Each fruit contains 8 to 12 seeds.

Variegated mutation 
There is also a variegated mutation of the regular calamansi, showing green stripes on yellow fruit.

Uses

Culinary arts 

The fruits are sour and are often used for preserves or cooking. The calamansi bears a small citrus fruit that is used to flavor foods and drinks. Despite its outer appearance and its aroma, the taste of the fruit itself is quite sour, although the peel is sweet. Calamansi marmalade can be made in the same way as orange marmalade. The fruit is a source of vitamin C.

The fruit can be frozen whole and used as ice cubes in beverages such as tea, soft drinks, water, and cocktails. The juice can be used in place of that of the common Persian lime (also called Bearss lime). The juice is extracted by crushing the whole fruit, and makes a flavorful drink similar to lemonade. A liqueur can be made from the whole fruits, in combination with vodka and sugar.

Philippines 

In Filipino cuisines, the juice is used to marinate and season fish, fowl and pork. It is also used as an ingredient in dishes like sinigang (a sour meat or seafood broth) and kinilaw (raw fish marinated in vinegar and/or citrus juices). It is very commonly used as a condiment in dishes like pancit or lugaw, or in the basic sawsawan (dip) of calamansi juice and soy sauce/fish sauce used for fish, spring rolls, dumplings and various savoury dishes. It is also used in various beverages, notably as calamansi juice, a Filipino drink similar to lemonade.

In other regions

Indonesia
The fruit is used in local recipes in northern Indonesia, especially around the North Sulawesi region. Fish are spritzed and marinated with the juice prior to cooking to eliminate the "fishy" smell. Kuah asam ("sour soup") is a regional clear fish broth made with calamansi juice.

Florida 

In Florida, the fruit is used in its fully ripe form with a more mature flavor profile than the unripe version. Tasters note elements of apricot, tangerine, lemon, pineapple, and guava. The peel is so thin that each fruit must be hand snipped from the tree to avoid tearing.  The entire fruit minus the stems and seeds can be used. It is hand processed and pureed or juiced and used in various products such as calamondin cake, coulis, marmalade, and jam. The peels can be dehydrated and used as a gourmet flavoring with salt and sugar. The fruit was popular with Florida cooks in cake form from the 1920s to the 1950s.

Floridians who have a calamansi in the yard often use the juice in a summer variation of lemonade or limeade, as mentioned above, and, left a bit sour, it cuts thirst with the distinctive flavor; also it can be used on fish and seafood, or wherever any other sour citrus would be used.

Cultivation 

The Philippines is the only major producer of calamansi. It ranks as the fourth most widely-grown fruit crop in the Philippines, after banana, mango, and pineapple. It is primarily grown for its juice extracts which are exported to the United States, Japan, South Korea, Canada, and Hong Kong, among others. The Philippines exports between 160,000 and 190,000 metric tons of calamansi juice each year. Major production centers include the Southwestern Tagalog Region, Central Luzon, and the Zamboanga Peninsula. Its cultivation has spread from the Philippines throughout Southeast Asia, India, Hawaii, the West Indies, and Central and North America, though only on a small scale.

In sub-tropical and parts of warm temperate North America, × Citrofortunella microcarpa is grown primarily as an ornamental plant in gardens, and in pots and container gardens on terraces and patios. The plant is especially attractive when the fruits are present.

The plant is sensitive to prolonged and/or extreme cold and is therefore limited outdoors to tropical, sub-tropical and the warmer parts of warm temperate climates (such as the coastal plain of the southeastern United States (USDA zones 8b - 11), parts of California, southern Arizona, southern Texas, and Hawaii). Potted plants are brought into a greenhouse, conservatory, or indoors as a houseplant during the winter periods in regions with cooler climates.

In cultivation within the United Kingdom, this plant has gained the Royal Horticultural Society's Award of Garden Merit (confirmed 2017).

See also 
Citrus depressa (shikwasa, hirami lemon), a similar cultivar widely used in Taiwan and Okinawa, Japan
Citrus poonensis (ponkan orange), a similarly sized sweet orange from China

References

External links 

Calamondin – The Most Versatile Fruit at Aggie Horticulture.

Asian cuisine
Citrus hybrids
Flora of China
Flora of Malesia
Fruits originating in Asia
Garden plants of Asia
Ornamental trees
Kumquats
Fruit trees